Siti binti Saad (1880–1950) was a pioneering artist in the taarab genre of east African music. The first East African singer to make commercial recordings, she made over 150 gramophone recordings during her lifetime. She also introduced a new Indian-inspired element of dance and pantomime into taarab music, called natiki. In an era in which male singers predominated, she was a pioneer as a woman singer in the genre. In contrast to previous singers who only sang in Arabic, she also sang in Swahili. She sang in cities of the coast of  Tanganyika and Zanzibar.

The peak of her career was from 1928 to 1939, but she remained active until her death in 1950. Subsequent to her death, more women singers appeared in formerly all-male singing clubs. Taarab also became performed mostly in Swahili rather than in Arabic.

History
Siti binti Saad was born in the village of Fumba, Zanzibar sometime around the year 1880. As a child, she was known by the nickname 'Mtumwa' (slave) because of a contemporary Swahili custom of giving children negative nicknames.

Her father was Saadi, from the Nyamwezi tribe from Tabora, and her mother was from the Zigua tribe from Tanga; both were born in Zanzibar to very poor families and were engaged in agricultural activities and pottery manufacture. To her parents' disappointment, Siti herself was unable to master pottery like her mother, but she managed to contribute by bringing her mother's pots into town for sale.

As the Swahili say "being born poor isn't dying poor".Siti was blessed with the special gift of singing. In her early life, she used singing to sell her mother's pottery: her singing voice could travel a distance of many miles, signalling that Mtumwa's pottery was being sold that day. Siti was said to have the lungs with great strength like a lion's.

Since at that time education for female children wasn't taken seriously, Siti wasn't able go to school nor attend Koranic studies. So she decided to move to the city to better her life. She had the fortune to meet a member of the taarab group Nadi Ikhwani Safa named Ali Muhsin. At that time, Nadi Ikhwani Safa was the only taarab group founded by Sultan Barghash bin Said of Zanzibar, who loved comfort and luxury. It was an all-male group, as it was seen as indecent for women to join musical groups. Lord Muhsin volunteered to teach Siti to sing, accompanying musical instruments and Arabic. He then introduced her to the other members of Nadi Ikhwani Safa who without hesitation began to organize various performances for her in the community. They received many invitations, especially from the Sultan and other rich Arabs, and to perform at various weddings and other celebrations. Around this time, she adopted the name 'Siti', which has a double-meaning of both "lady" and "fife/whistle".

As time went by, Siti's fame grew. In 1928, Columbia Records and His Master's Voice heard the fame of Siti binti Saad and so they invited her and the group to record at their studio in Mumbai. Her music was instantly popular in both India and Zanzibar, and her return to Zanzibar was met with great fanfare. While a typical record only sold about 800-900 copies during its first years, Siti's records had sold 72,000 copies by mid-1931. Her popularity led to the creation of a recording studio in Zanzibar.

Siti recorded songs in Arabic, but she was most acclaimed for her ones in Swahili. Although only the relatively well-to-do could afford to buy records, her popularity spread among East Africans of all social classes and her records played an important role in making taarab music accessible to the general public.

Siti continued her musical activities until old age. Shortly before her death she met the famous writer and poet Shaaban Robert, who interviewed her to write her biography in a book he called Wasifu wa Siti binti Saad. This biography is thought to be among Tanzania's greatest literature and is taught in secondary school in Tanzania.

On July 8, 1950, Siti binti Saad died leaving a huge gap in the field of taarab. Although a gap that cannot be filled, there are many people who continue to sing in her style. Until her death in 2013, the pre-eminent exponent was Bi Kidude.

Siti binti Saad rose from the oppressed classes to make taarabu music her vehicle, calling for social justice in what is now Tanzania. She protested against class oppression and men's abuse of women; her song "The Police have Stopped" sharply criticized a judge who let a rich wife-murderer go free. She seemed unafraid even of the sultan.

Even after her death, her name is still widely used as a model for bravery. The Association of Women Journalists Tanzania (TAMWA) named their party newspaper Voice of the Siti. To this day Siti is used as a measure of teaching taarab.

Example on CD anthology recording
 Echoes of Africa: Early Recordings (Wergo SM 1642 2)

See also
Taarab

References

External links
History of Taarab
biographical site

1880s births
1950 deaths
Singers from Zanzibar
Zanzibari people
Swahili-language singers